Steven Nistor (born May 22, 1979) is an American touring and studio drummer, best known for his work with Daniel Lanois and Sparks.

Biography

Early life
Steven Nistor was born and raised in Detroit.  He attended Wayne State University where he earned a Bachelor of Jazz Studies on a full scholarship and mentored under Branford Marsalis, Ben Sidran and Kenny Werner. During this time he studied drums with Gerald Cleaver and Scott Amendola, and has since studied with Ralph Humphrey, Ra-Kalam Bob Moses and Dave Elitch.

Career
Nistor has recorded with producers Rick Rubin, Danger Mouse, Daniel Lanois,  Tucker Martine, Randall Dunn, Steve Albini, Ryan Freeland, John Hill, Warren Defever, and Scott Litt and has recorded/performed with Iron & Wine, Sam Amidon, Tinariwen, The Avett Brothers, Van Dyke Parks, Marissa Nadler, Sparklehorse, "Weird Al" Yankovic, Peter Buck, Emmylou Harris, Gnarls Barkley, Todd Rundgren, Wild Belle, Brian Eno, Iggy Pop, Lonnie Holley, Garth Hudson, Aoife O’Donovan, Passion Pit, The Flaming Lips, Josh Klinghoffer, Ben Sollee, Beth Orton, His Name Is Alive, Hal Willner, Trixie Whitley, Laura Veirs, Bill Frisell, Michael Gibbs, Robert Plant, Buddy Guy, Alison Krauss, Skerik, Jim White, Bernie Worrell, and is a member of the bands Sparks, Brian Blade's Mama Rosa, and WL.

He was featured twice in Modern Drummer magazine, has appeared twice as a guest on the drumming podcast I'd Hit That, has been the featured drummer on Late Night with Seth Meyers twice  and has taught at Interlochen Center for the Arts as well as the Detroit Institute of Music Education.  Steven has also been featured in four major motion pictures, working with directors Leos Carax, Edgar Wright, and David Lynch.

Selected Discography

Selected filmography

References

American people of Romanian descent
Musicians from Detroit
Living people
1979 births
20th-century American drummers
American male drummers
21st-century American drummers
20th-century American male musicians
21st-century American male musicians